John Gilligan is an independent politician and former Mayor of Limerick from 2008 to 2009. He was the first independent (non-party) politician to be mayor of limerick since 1962 and was the 812th Mayor of Limerick.

He was elected in successive elections for the Limerick No. 2 electoral area and subsequently the Limerick East electoral area, from 1991. He has also stood for election to Dáil Éireann in the Limerick East constituency.

Gilligan and Sinn Féin councillor Maurice Quinlivan were the only councillors on Limerick City Council to oppose the Household charge. Both men refused to pay the charge, and Gilligan spoke at a number of Campaign Against Home and Water Taxes protests.

In mid-2018 he announced his decision not to not seek re-election in the 2019 Limerick City and County Council election.

References

Mayors of Limerick (city)
Local councillors in County Limerick
Living people
Year of birth missing (living people)